St. Alphonsus Church may refer to:

 Church of St Alphonse Liguori, Birkirkara, in Birkirkara, Malta
 Novena Church, Singapore (officially the Church of Saint Alphonsus)

 Italy 
 Church of St. Alphonsus Liguori, Rome, Italy
 Santa Maria della Mercede e Sant'Alfonso Maria de' Liguori, in the historic center of Naples, Italy

 United States
 Saint Alphonsus Church, New Orleans, Louisiana
 National Shrine of St. Alphonsus Liguori, in the Archdiocese of Baltimore, Maryland, United States
 St. Alphonsus Liguori Catholic Church (St. Louis), Missouri
 St. Alphonsus Ligouri Church (New York City)